Stay with Me (MGV 8302) is an album by the jazz singer Billie Holiday, accompanied by Tony Scott and his Orchestra. It contains all the material from a session recorded February 14, 1955, in New York City, and released in 1958 on producer Norman Granz's Verve label.

For the CD reissue in 1991 another session was appended, that Granz had previously issued as part of the self-titled Billie Holiday LP on his Clef Record label (10" LP, Clef EPC 224/Verve MGC 690). The recording from April 14, 1954, at the same studio with "Billie Holliday and Her Band", consisted of the Oscar Peterson Trio, Ed Shaughnessy on drums, and trumpeter Charlie Shavers as the only members of both sessions beside Holiday. Beyond that, all tracks were part of many compilations and the complete recording issues of Billie Holiday.

Reception

In a review for AllMusic, Ron Wynn stated that Holiday "was fading, but hadn't lost the dramatic quality in her delivery, nor her ability to project and tell a shattering story."

Jack Kenny, writing for Jazz Views, noted that the "readings that [Holiday] gives to popular tunes of her day can reveal depths that probably the writers of the lyrics never envisaged. There are numerous examples on this CD. The one that stands out is 'Love For Sale'... She sings it as though for the first time; you hear it as if for the first time. It was fortunate that Norman Granz managed to put her under contract in what proved to be her final years."

Track listing
Side one
 "I Wished on the Moon" (Ralph Rainger, Dorothy Parker) – 6:48
 "Ain't Misbehavin'" (Fats Waller, Harry Brooks, Andy Razaf) – 4:38
 "Everything Happens to Me" (Tom Adair, Matt Dennis) – 6:20

Side two
 "Say It Isn't So" (Irving Berlin) – 3:01
 "I've Got My Love to Keep Me Warm" (Irving Berlin) – 3:55
 "Always" (Irving Berlin) – 3:57
 "Do Nothing till You Hear from Me" (Duke Ellington, Bob Russell) – 5:00

Appended session on CD release in 1991, previously released on Billie Holiday (probably 1954)
 "How Deep Is the Ocean" (Irving Berlin) – 3:01
 "What a Little Moonlight Can Do" (Harry Woods) – 3:12
 "I Cried for You" (Gus Arnheim, Arthur Freed, Abe Lyman) – 2:29

Personnel
Original session of February 14, 1955
Billie Holiday with Tony Scott and his Orchestra
Billie Holiday – Vocals
Charlie Shavers – Trumpet
Budd Johnson – Tenor sax
Tony Scott – Clarinet
Carl Drinkard / Billy Taylor – Piano
Billy Bauer – Guitar
Leonard Gaskin – Bass
Cozy Cole – Drums
Leroy Lovett – Arranger

Session of April 14, 1954, added on CD release 1991
Billie Holiday and Her Band
Billie Holiday – Vocals
Charlie Shavers – Trumpet
Oscar Peterson – Piano
Herb Ellis – Guitar
Ray Brown – Bass
Ed Shaughnessy – Drums

References

1955 albums
Billie Holiday albums
Verve Records albums
Albums produced by Norman Granz